A Little Soap and Water is a 1935 Fleischer Studios animated short film starring Betty Boop.

Synopsis
Pudgy the Pup loses his bone on top of the coal bucket. Meanwhile, Betty Boop is preparing the wash tub for a dog bath. When Pudgy realizes what Betty has planned, he tries to get away. Betty has to pursue him through the house, including several laps under the living room rug. Betty finally gets Pudgy into the tub and washes him while singing the title song. Pudgy is all nice and clean, until he finds his bone, and knocks over the coal bucket to get it.

Releases
A Little Soap and Water has been released as part of several different DVD compilations: by BCI Entertainment (2003 & 2004), Genius Entertainment (2004), GT Media (2004), and Mill Creek Entertainment (2007 & 2007), and Echo Bridge Home Entertainment (2007 & 2010).

Notes
 Some of the song elements in the beginning are missing in most prints, and is very rare.

References

External links
 A Little Soap and Water at the Big Cartoon Database.
 A Little Soap and Water on YouTube.
 A Little Soap and Water at IMDb.

1935 short films
American black-and-white films
1935 musical comedy films
Betty Boop cartoons
1930s American animated films
1935 animated films
Paramount Pictures short films
Fleischer Studios short films
Short films directed by Dave Fleischer
American musical comedy films
Animated films about dogs
1930s English-language films
American comedy short films
American animated short films